Adineh Masjed-e Bala (also Romanized as Ādīneh Masjed-e Bālā; also known as Ādīneh and Ādīneh Masjed-e ‘Olyā) is a village in Zalian Rural District, Zalian District, Shazand County, Markazi Province, Iran. At the 2006 census, its population was 35, in 17 families.

References 

Populated places in Shazand County